, best known as Akko, was the bassist, back-up vocalist, and lyricist of GO!GO!7188. She has also released two solo albums under her maiden name . She sings, writes lyrics, and composes music.

In GO!GO!7188, she seemed to be the most outspoken member; she did most of the talking during their interviews and live shows.

History 
While in high school she met Yuu, who formed Jellyfish, a JUDY AND MARY cover band made-up of five girls including Akiko. When Jellyfish broke up a few years later, Yuu and Akiko would remain together and in 1998 form the rock band GO!GO!7188. Although Yuu is the lead vocalist of the group, her style of performance is somewhat reserved. This goes in sharp contrast to Akiko's energetic dancing and bass playing, making Akiko the most visible personality during the live performances despite their drummer, Turkey, garnering the label of "leader."

In 2003, she released  on the BM Label, and in 2005  under EMI Japan.

Discography 
 Kirari (October 13, 2003)
 Aruyoude Naiyoude, Arumono (November 2, 2005)

References

External links 
 Akiko Hamada's Official Website
 Akiko's profile on the English GO!GO!7188 fansite Rock Rabbit

Japanese rock bass guitarists
People from Kagoshima
Living people
1980 births
Musicians from Kagoshima Prefecture
21st-century bass guitarists